William Nadylam (born ) is a French actor. He is best known for playing the role of Yusuf Kama in Fantastic Beasts film series from the Wizarding World franchise.

Filmography

Film

TV series

References

External links

1966 births
Living people
French male film actors
French male television actors
French male stage actors
People from Montpellier